All the Rage!! is the fourth studio album by American electronic music duo Blood on the Dance Floor, released on June 14, 2011.  Commercially, it is their least successful album with Jayy Von Monroe. The album features three collaborations with the duo's protege Lady Nogrady.

Track listing

Personnel
Blood on the Dance Floor
 Jayy Von Monroe – clean and unclean vocals
 Dahvie Vanity – clean vocals

Additional musicians
 Lady Nogrady – vocals and violin
 JJ Demon – vocals and scratching
 Nick Nasty – vocals

Charts

References 

2011 albums
Blood on the Dance Floor (duo) albums